72 Herculis is a single star in the northern constellation of Hercules. The Flamsteed designation for this star comes from the publication Historia Coelestis Britannica by John Flamsteed. It is the 72nd star in Flamsteed's list of stars in Hercules. This star is faintly visible to the naked eye with an apparent visual magnitude of 5.4. Parallax measurements show this star to be located at a distance of about 47 light years from the Sun. It is drifting closer with a radial velocity of −78.6 km/s, and is predicted to come to within  in around 98,000 years.

This is an ordinary G-type main-sequence star with a stellar classification of G0 V. It is similar in mass to the Sun, with a 13% larger radius. The star is an estimated 4–7 billion years old with a projected rotational velocity of 1 km/s. The level of chromospheric activity appears to be at or below that in the Sun.

As of 2010, no planetary companion had been detected orbiting this star. The Washington Visual Double Star Catalog for 1996 showed two visual companions of this star. The first is a visual magnitude 9.7 star located 289.1 arc seconds away. The second is only separated by 8.7 arc seconds, and is magnitude 12.9. It is unknown whether these visual companions are gravitationally-bound to 72 Her.

References

G-type main-sequence stars
Herculis, 072
Suspected variables

Hercules (constellation)
Herculis, w
Durchmusterung objects
Herculis, 072
0672
157214
084862
6458